The Knockout stage of the 2014 ICC World Twenty20 took place from 3 April to 6 April 2014. Defending champions the West Indies were knocked out in the first semi-final, while India defeated South Africa in the second semi-final.

Sri Lanka and India had played each other over sixty times in the last seven years, with India winning the majority of the matches. During the tournament India was the only unbeaten team heading into the final, whereas Sri Lanka had lost a group match to England. Despite this, statistically there had been little between the two teams during the tournament. India, sent into bat by Sri Lanka after they won the toss, posted 130 runs in their 20 overs. Virat Kohli top scored with 77, but Yuvraj Singh's 11 runs off 21 balls slowed the innings momentum in the final overs. Sri Lanka reached 134 runs in 17.5 overs with the loss of 4 wickets. Kumar Sangakkara, playing his last Twenty20 international match, guided Sri Lanka home with an unbeaten 52 runs. Sangakkara was named Player of the Match, while Kohli was named Player of the Tournament.

Semi-finals

Final

See also
 2014 ICC World Twenty20 Group Stage
 2014 ICC World Twenty20 Super 10s

References

External links
Official 2014 ICC World Twenty20 site

Finals